Kuwait is an emirate with an autocratic political system. The political system consists of an appointed judiciary, appointed government (dominated by the Al Sabah ruling family), and nominally elected parliament.

Constitution
The Constitution of Kuwait was ratified in 1962 and has elements of a presidential and parliamentary system of government. The Emir is the head of state, whose powers are listed in the constitution.

Executive branch
The Constitution of Kuwait was promulgated in 1962.

Government

The prime minister is appointed by the unelected head of state (Emir of Kuwait). The prime minister chooses the cabinet of ministers (government).

Emir
The Emir's powers are defined by the 1961 constitution. These powers include appointing the prime minister, who in turn chooses the cabinet (government). Upon the death of the Emir, the crown prince succeeds.

Power in Kuwait has traditionally been balanced between the Emir — particularly under Mubarak — and the merchant class. Mubarak effectively built the modern Kuwaiti state, establishing the tax system, trade levies, a customs administration, and the provision of social services. Political institutions were built in Kuwait in large part due to exit vetoes exercised by merchants on Mubarak. The acquiescence of the merchants and the broader population to the rule of the Emir and the Sabah family was due to a division of monopoly rents: the Sabah family, through the state, to control the oil industry, and the merchants to dominate other industries. The public at large was given social services from education to health care, funded by oil wealth. This arrangement has allowed the ruling family "to maintain power without making substantial political concessions."

Judicial branch

The judiciary in Kuwait is not independent of the government, the Emir appoints all the judges and many judges are foreign nationals from Egypt. In each administrative district of Kuwait, there is a Summary Court (also called Courts of First Instance which are composed of one or more divisions, like a Traffic Court or an Administrative Court); then there is Court of Appeals; Cassation Court, and lastly - a Constitutional Court which interprets the constitution and deals with disputes related to the constitutionality of laws. Kuwait has a civil law legal system.

Legislative branch

The National Assembly is theoretically the main legislative branch in Kuwait. The National Assembly theoretically has the power to remove government ministers from their post. The National Assembly can have up to 50 MPs. Fifty deputies are theoretically elected by popular vote to serve four-year terms. Members of the cabinet also sit in the parliament as deputies.

See also
Government of Kuwait
History of Kuwait
Political issues in Kuwait

References

External links
Current Ministerial Formation (Council of Ministers General Secretariat)
Official English names of Kuwaiti ministers and ministries (Kuwaiti Government)

 
Government of Kuwait